Expo '29 may refer to:

 1929 Barcelona International Exposition, Barcelona
 Chosun Exhibition, Seoul
 Ibero-American Exposition of 1929, Seville
 North East Coast Exhibition, Newcastle upon Tyne, England

1929 in England
1929 Barcelona International Exposition
World's fairs in England
World's fairs in Korea
World's fairs in Seville